Chaumont station (French: Gare de Chaumont) is a French railway station serving the town Chaumont, Haute-Marne department, eastern France. It is situated on the Paris–Mulhouse railway. The station is served by regional trains towards Paris, Châlons-en-Champagne, Dijon and Vesoul.

See also 

 List of SNCF stations in Grand Est

References

Railway stations in Grand Est
Railway stations in France opened in 1857